Sursee Stadthalle is an indoor sporting arena located in Sursee, Switzerland.  The capacity of the arena is 3,500 people.  It hosted some matches at the 2006 European Men's Handball Championship.

External links
http://www.stadthalle-sursee.ch

Indoor arenas in Switzerland
Buildings and structures in the canton of Lucerne
Handball venues in Switzerland